Grechanikov is a rural locality (a khutor) in Alexeyevsky District, Belgorod Oblast, Russia. The population was 12 as of 2010. There is 1 street.

Geography 
Grechanikov is located 13 km southwest of Alexeyevka (the district's administrative centre) by road. Sidorkin is the nearest rural locality.

References 

Rural localities in Alexeyevsky District, Belgorod Oblast
Biryuchensky Uyezd